Nader Nimai is an Indian film based on the life of Chaitanya Mahaprabhu. This film was directed Sri Bimal Roy and released in 1960 in Bengali language.

Cast
Asim Kumar
Chhabi Biswas
Jahar Roy
Gurudas Banerjee
Jahar Ganguly
Shyam Laha
Moni Shrimani
Satya Banerjee
Tulsi Chakraborty
Renuka Roy
Sabita Basu
Shobha Sen

References

1960 films
Bengali-language Indian films
Films directed by Bimal Roy
1960s Bengali-language films